Global Village Folk Museum was a museum in Seoul, South Korea. It is located near Mt. Namsan.

See also
List of museums in Seoul
List of museums in South Korea
Korean Folk Village Museum

References

External links
Official site 

Museums in Seoul
Museums established in 2002
2002 establishments in South Korea